Green Acres Mall is an indoor shopping mall located in South Valley Stream, New York, off Sunrise Highway in Nassau County near the border of New York City and the Incorporated Village of Valley Stream.
As of 2022, the mall currently features two Macy's locations, as well as a Primark coming soon. The mall currently features staples like Express, H&M, and Forever 21. The mall is the 18th largest in the United States. The mall is extremely popular in Nassau County and in the neighboring New York City borough of Queens.

History

Green Acres Mall was built in 1956 on the northern portion of Curtiss Airfield and was one of Long Island's first open air malls.  It was partially built on the former site of the Columbia Aircraft Corporation.  In 1968, the mall was enclosed "to create an even more appealing shopping environment."  At the time, there were three anchor stores, Lane's, JCPenney, and Gimbels. There were more renovations and an expansion in 1983 including adding a second level, food court and a fourth anchor store, Sears.

In the early days of the mall, WMCA 'Good Guys' would broadcast from the mall as would WABC.

The ceilings, floors, and food court have been going under multimillion-dollar renovations to better compare to Long Island's largest mall, Roosevelt Field. The food court's renovation was finished in early 2006. The mall's other renovations were finished in March, 2007. New to the area is a Best Buy, Petsmart and a BJ's Wholesale Club which opened in early 2007.

Kohl's closed at the mall in 2019.

Anchor stores
The mall currently has two anchors: Macy's and Macy's Men's & Furniture Gallery. It is currently owned and managed by The Macerich Company, having been previously owned and operated by Vornado Realty Trust until January 2013. It was announced in May 2012 that Vornado planned to sell the mall and some of its other retail centers, and in October 2012, it was announced that the mall was being sold to Macerich in a deal that completed in the beginning of 2013.

Former anchors
Gimbels - Closed in 1987. Replaced by Abraham & Straus, then Macy's
Lane's - Closed in 1960. Replaced by Love's, then S. Klein, then Korvettes, then Stern's, then Macy's Men's & Furniture Gallery

Green Acres Commons

In 2015 the Sunrise Cinemas complex at 750 Sunrise Highway was acquired by RIPCONY, a real estate management company, which completed the 366,000 SF of new shops and standalone eateries for Macerich Companies; dubbed Green Acres Commons. The complex opened in October 2016 with BJs Brewhouse, Buffalo Wild Wings, Ulta, 24-Hour Fitness, DXL, Five Below, Dick's Sporting Goods, HomeGoods, Sonic Drive-In Restaurant, Ashley Furniture store, Burlington and in 2017 CapitalOneBank and 2019 AT&T. A Marshalls and HBC Bank are projected for future occupancy. Existing properties Bronx BBQ, a 8,000SF eatery on the northwest corner remained. To the south are Walmart and Home Depot. There have been lawsuits to rollback a $4.5 million tax increase affecting the three-town area surrounding Green Acres Mall. Hempstead Town Industrial Development Agency provided a tax incentive to Green Acres Mall that would reduce the 2016 liability by that amount, resulting in increases that residents met with protests. The 15-year deal hinged on the promise of added security, renovations to the mall complex, and new higher-end stores which resulted in the commons.

Public transportation
Green Acres Mall is served by the NICE bus  as well as the Elmont Flexi. In addition, the Q5 and Q85 bus routes of the New York City Transit Authority serve the mall. The bus terminal is located at the south end of the mall at Ring Road South.

See also
 Roosevelt Field
 Sunrise Mall (Massapequa Park, New York)
 Broadway Mall
 Americana Manhasset

References

External links 

 Green Acres Mall official web site
 International Council of Shopping Centers: Green Acres Mall

Valley Stream, New York
Macerich
Shopping malls in Nassau County, New York
Shopping malls established in 1956
Shopping malls in the New York metropolitan area
1956 establishments in New York (state)